Jester Records was a record label founded in 1998 by Kristoffer Rygg (also known as Garm, Trickster G, G. Wolf and Fiery G. Maelstrom) after conflicts between his band Ulver and their German/American label Century Media Records.

Artists
 1349 Rykkinn
 Arcturus
 Bogus Blimp
 Anthony Curtis
 Espen Jørgensen
 Esperanza
 Head Control System
 Kåre João
 Origami Galaktika
 Rotoscope
 Single Unit
 Star of Ash
 Ulver
 Upland
 Virus
 When
 Zweizz & Joey Hopkins

See also
 List of record labels

External links
 Official site

Norwegian record labels
Record labels established in 1998
Black metal record labels